The Sofia University of Mining and Geology is a state university in Sofia, Bulgaria, founded in 1953.

History
The university were established in 1953 as High Mining and Geological Institute -  (HMGI) with two faculties - Mining and Metallurgy and Mining and Mechanical Engineering.

Structure 
Faculty of Mining and Metallurgy
Faculty of Mining and Mechanical Engineering 
Faculty of Geology 
Humanitarian Department

Sport 
Basketball team of University of Mining and Geology

References 

Geology education
Universities in Sofia